Sedick Conrad (born 15 February 1942) is a South African cricketer. He played in nineteen first-class matches between 1971 and 1991. In 1975, along with Edward Habane, Conrad was one of the first black African players to play in a mixed first-class side against a touring team since the 1890s.

See also
 International cricket in South Africa from 1971 to 1981

References

External links
 

1942 births
Living people
South African cricketers
Western Province cricketers
Place of birth missing (living people)